The Arizona striped whiptail (Aspidoscelis arizonae) is a species of whiptail lizard endemic to the United States. This is a species of lizards that lives in Arizona's grassy desert areas and is normally found hiding in desert shrubs.

A. arizonae are identifiable by their brown and blue bodies with noticeable yellow stripes. They are easily confused with the Pai striped whiptail.

References

Reptiles described in 1896
Aspidoscelis
Taxa named by John Van Denburgh